Anastasiya Vasilevna Makeyeva (Russian: Анастаси́я Васи́льевна Маке́ева; born December 23, 1981) is a Russian actress, singer and model. She is best known for her roles in Moscow Mission (2006), Sniffer (2013) and Home, Sweet Home... (2008).

Biography 
She was born on December 23, 1981 in Krasnodar, Russian SFSR, Soviet Union (now Russia).

In 2008-2010, Anastasiya played the main role of Mercedes in Russia (the only one at that time) production of the musical Monte Cristo. In the summer of 2010, she starred for XXL magazine and in the fall of 2019, she became the cover of magazine Trends People. 

First husband is actor Pyotr Kislov, 2006; the marriage lasted 7 months. From 2007 to 2008 she met with Alexei Makarov. From August 2010 to July 2016 she was married to actor, singer and composer Gleb Matveychuk. From November 2018 to 2019, she was married to a lawyer and businessman Alexander Sakovich. The fourth husband is Sromik Malkov, May 2021. In marriage, she took the double surname Srakeyeva-Malkova.

Filmography

Musicals 
 2002 — «Dracula» — Adriana, Sandra
 2003 — «Jay wedding» — Magpie, Crow
 2008 — 2010 — «Monte Cristo» — Mercedes
 2010 — 2011 — «Zorro» — Luisa
 2010 — «The Strange Case of Dr. Jekyll and Mr. Hyde» — Emma Carew (2016 — Lucy Harris)
 2011 — «The Witches of Eastwick» — Alex
 2012 — «Francois Viyon. Three days in Paris» — Isabella
 2012 — «Jesus Christ Superstar» — Maria Magdalena
 2012 — 2013 — «Mamma Mia!» — Donna Sheridan
 2013 — 2014 — «Chicago» — Roxie Hart
 2014 — 2016 — «Territory of Passion» — Marquise de Merteuil, Madame de Tourvel
 2014 — «Master and Margarita» — Margarita
 2016 — «Onegin» — Tatyana Larina
 2016 — «Chudo-Yudo» — Murena
 2018 — «Yoshkin cat» — Raisa
 2018 — «Lolita» — Anna Vyrubova
 2019 — «Viy» — Pannochka
 2020 — «Don Juan. The untold story» — Pilar
 2020 — «Diamond Chariot» — O-Yumi
 2021 — «Last Trial» — Takhisis (single interpretation)

Awards 
 Winner of the contest "Miss Krasnodar-1998" (1998, Krasnodar)
 Winner of the contest "Miss Academy of Russia-2000" (2000, Moscow)
 Vice-Miss of the Miss MK-Europe contest (2004, Spain)
 Vice-Miss "Miss Universe, Russia" (2004, Moscow)

References 

1981 births
Living people
Russian film actresses
Russian television actresses
Russian voice actresses
21st-century Russian actresses
People from Krasnodar
Russian women singers
Russian female adult models
Russian television presenters
Russian rock musicians